Life, Liberty & Levin is an American political talk show hosted by conservative personality Mark Levin and broadcast by Fox News. It premiered on February 25, 2018. Each week features a long-form interview with 1 to 3 guests for the hour.

In November 2017, Fox News announced that it had signed Levin for a weekend talk show to air on Sunday nights, beginning in February 2018. The program explores the “fundamental values and principles undergirding American society, culture, politics, and current events, and their relevance to the nation's future and everyday lives of citizens." The show currently airs new episodes on Sundays at 8:00 PM ET, with a repeat airing at 11:00 PM ET.

Although most episodes have guests in-studio, Levin conducted interviews via video chat during the COVID-19 pandemic. Levin resumed in-person interviews on August 2, 2020, when he hosted Sean Hannity.

Frequent Guests
Levin has interviewed an array of different people. Below are guests that he frequently speaks with.

Sean Hannity: host of Hannity
Kayleigh McEnany: co-host of Outnumbered, former White house Press Secretary
Joe Concha: Fox News Contributor, Media Columnist for The Hill
Pete Hegseth: co-host of Fox & Friends Weekend
Leo Terrell: Fox News Contributor, Civil Rights Attorney
Ron Desantis: Governor of Florida
Dan Bongino: Host of Unfiltered w/ Dan Bongino, former secret service agent
Peter Schweizer: Author 
Mollie Hemingway: Fox News Contributor
Victor Davis Hanson: Senior fellow at the Hoover Institute

Episode list

References

External links 
 

Fox News original programming
2010s American television news shows
2018 American television series debuts
Conservative media in the United States